Sinocyclocheilus luopingensis is a species of ray-finned fish in the genus Sinocyclocheilus.

References 

luopingensis
Fish described in 2002